Stolze is a surname shared by the following individuals:

Dorothy Stolze (1923-2003),  All-American girls professional baseball league player
 Fritz Stolze (1910—1973), German water polo player
 Gerhard Stolze (1926—1979), German opera singer
 Greg Stolze (born 1970), U.S. novelist and role-playing game writer
 Heinrich August Wilhelm Stolze (1798—1867), German stenographer 
 Jim Stolze (born 1973), Dutch author
 Lena Stolze (born 1956), German actress
 Pierre Stolze (born 1952), French science fiction writer

Stolz is a German noun meaning "pride".

See also
Stolz
Stoltz

German-language surnames